Richard (Rick) Bourke (16 November 1953 – 15 August 2006) was an Australian rugby league footballer.  He played for Cronulla-Sutherland and South Sydney in the New South Wales Rugby League (NSWRL) competition.

Playing career
A Sharkies legend, Rick Bourke played 10 seasons for Cronulla at wing and fullback including scoring their only try in the 10-7 1973 Grand Final loss to a Bob Fulton inspired Manly-Warringah at the Sydney Cricket Ground. He also played on the wing for Cronulla in the drawn Grand Final against Manly in 1978, as well as playing fullback in the replay played just two days later. Manly won the replay 16-0. A local junior from Caringbah, New South Wales, Bourke scored thirty eight tries during his ten-year career at Cronulla, and was a crowd favourite.

He played his final season with South Sydney in 1983.

Death
Rick Bourke died of cancer on 15 August 2006 at the John Flynn Hospital, Tugun, Queensland aged 52.

References

1953 births
2006 deaths
Australian rugby league players
Cronulla-Sutherland Sharks players
Deaths from cancer in Queensland
Rugby league players from Sydney
Rugby league wingers
South Sydney Rabbitohs players